Bruce Hardy McLain (born September 1952) is an American retired  hedge fund manager, and a co-founder and former managing partner of CVC Capital Partners.

Early life
Bruce Hardy McLain was born in September 1952, in San Francisco, US.

McLain earned a bachelor's degree in economics and public policy from Duke University, North Carolina, followed by an MBA in finance and marketing from UCLA, California.

Career
In December 2012, McLain retired after 25 years with CVC.

McLain has been a non-executive director of Samsonite International since June 2014, and Formula One, the Colomer Group and the Lecta Group.

Personal life
McLain lives in London with his wife Helle and six children.

In May 2017, he gave £100,000 to the Conservative Party. In May 2020 he donated another £50,000 to the Tories.

References

1952 births
Living people
American hedge fund managers
American company founders
Conservative Party (UK) donors
Duke University Trinity College of Arts and Sciences alumni
UCLA Anderson School of Management alumni
Businesspeople from San Francisco